This is a list of Canadian ambassadors and high commissioners to Ireland.  

From 1928 to 1949 Canada sent High Commissioners to the Irish Free State, which was a fellow member of the Commonwealth at the time.  

With the passage of the Republic of Ireland Act 1948, Ireland left the Commonwealth, and Canada and Ireland have exchanged ambassadors since.

Canadian embassy and official residence

The Canadian Embassy is located at 7-8 Wilton Terrace in Dublin near St Stephen's Green.

The ambassador lives at 22 Oakley Road, Ranelagh a rowhouse in The Triangle area. From 1954 to 2008 the ambassador lived at Strathmore in Killiney.

Canadian High Commissioners to the Irish Free State and the Dominion of Ireland 

From 1928 to 1949, while Ireland was a member state of the British Commonwealth of Nations, the Dominion of Canada and the Irish Free State (Dominion of Ireland from 1937 to 1949) exchanged High Commissioners.

Canadian ambassadors to the Republic of Ireland 

From 1949 onwards, after Ireland left the Commonwealth, Canada and the Republic of Ireland have exchanged Ambassadors.

Notes

References

See also
 Canada–Ireland relations
 Embassy of Ireland, Ottawa
 Strathmore (Killiney), residence of the Canadian Ambassador to Ireland (1957-2008)
 List of diplomatic missions in Ireland
 List of diplomatic missions of Canada

Ireland
 
Ambassadors, Canada
 
Ireland and the Commonwealth of Nations